Andrea Magrini (born 26 August 1997) is an Italian football player.

Club career
He made his Serie C debut for Ravenna on 17 September 2017 in a game against Teramo.

On 31 January 2020, he joined Carpi on loan.

On 5 October 2020 he signed a one-season contract with Como. On 1 February 2021, his contract was terminated by mutual consent.

References

External links
 

1997 births
People from Forlì
Footballers from Emilia-Romagna
Living people
Italian footballers
Association football midfielders
A.C. ChievoVerona players
Ravenna F.C. players
U.S. Città di Pontedera players
A.C. Carpi players
Como 1907 players
Serie C players
Serie D players
Sportspeople from the Province of Forlì-Cesena